The malimbe is a type of xylophone from the Congo  which is described as having both male and female counterparts; the former has 15 wooden bars, the latter has nine. "Malimbe" also refers to a lamellaphone or mbira type instrument amongst the Nyamwezi of Tanzania.

References

Bibliography
Anderson, Lois. The Miko Modal System of Kiganda Xylophone Music. 2 vols. Phd Diss. UCLA, 1968.
Galpin, Francis. A textbook of European musical instruments, their origin, history and character. (reprint) Westport, Connecticut: Greenwood Press, 1976.
Kaptain, Laurence. The wood that sings: the marimba in Chiapas, Mexico. Everett, Pa. : HoneyRock, 1992.
Tracey, Hugh, 'A Case for the Name Mbira' in the African Music Society Journal, no. 3 (1964)
Wiggins, Trevor and Joseph Kobom. Xylophone music from Ghana. Indiana, IN: White Cliffs Media, 1992.
Warner Dietz, Betty and Olatunji, Michael Babatunde. (1965). Musical Instruments of Africa: Their Nature, Use, and Place in The Life of a Deeply Musical People. New York: John Day Company.

Pitched percussion instruments
Keyboard percussion instruments
African musical instruments